Clément Joseph Tissot (1747 - 1826) was a French physician and a physiotherapist. He introduced remedial gymnastics as a treatment for orthopedic and surgical pathologies.

Life 
Born in Ornans in 1747, he was the son of a pharmacist from Besançon, where he studied medicine. In 1777 he joined the French Army as a surgeon. Soon, in contrast to the traditional immobilization technique, he introduced remedial gymnastics.

In 1780 he published his own ideas about physiotherapy, obtaining considerable attentions and honors. After the French Revolution he lost his job at court and was briefly imprisoned. Then he worked as an Assistant Medical and Surgical Director in the Napoleonic Army. He lived in Paris until his death in 1826.

Works 
French original edition:
 ,
Italien translation:

References 

French physiotherapists
1747 births
1826 deaths